Elliott Stein  (December 5, 1928 – November 7, 2012) was an American journalist and historian.
 
In the 1950s he managed a literary review in  Paris: "Janus." He also wrote for the review "Bizarre" with Kenneth Anger. He worked with Anger on Anger's book Hollywood Babylon.

In the years 1960–1970 he was a film critic in Paris for the Financial Times and for Village Voice.

Back in  New York in the 1970s, Stein wrote for the Village Voice and publishers like  "Criterion". He wrote regularly for Film Comment and Sight and Sound. He is referred to in the diaries and memoirs of Ned Rorem, Susan Sontag, John Ashbery and Richard Olney. He wrote New York City Inferno (1978) and Secrets of Sex (1970) and made a video-interview with himself (2005). He played in some movies: Les Coeurs Verts (1965) by Édouard Luntz; in New York: "Bizarre" (1970) (a.k.a. "Secrets of Sex").

References

External links

1928 births
2012 deaths
American columnists
American magazine founders
American film critics
Lafayette High School (New York City) alumni